A Patlak plot (sometimes called Gjedde–Patlak plot, Patlak–Rutland plot, or Patlak analysis) is a graphical analysis technique based on the compartment model that uses linear regression to identify and analyze pharmacokinetics of tracers involving irreversible uptake, such as in the case of deoxyglucose. It is used for the evaluation of nuclear medicine imaging data after the injection of a radioopaque or radioactive tracer.

The method is model-independent because it does not depend on any specific compartmental model configuration for the tracer, and the minimal assumption is that the behavior of the tracer can be approximated by two compartments – a "central" (or reversible) compartment that is in rapid equilibrium with plasma, and a "peripheral" (or irreversible) compartment, where tracer enters without ever leaving during the time of the measurements.  The amount of tracer in the region of interest is accumulating according to the equation:

 

The first term of the right-hand side represents tracer in the peripheral compartment, and the second term tracer in the central compartment.

 

The unknown constants  and  can be obtained by linear regression from a graph of  against .

See also 
 Logan plot
 Positron emission tomography
 Multi-compartment model
 Binding potential
 Deconvolution
 Albert Gjedde

References

Further literature

External links
 PMOD, Patlak Plot, PMOD Kinetic Modeling Tool (PKIN).
 Gjedde–Patlak plot, Turku PET Centre.

Mathematical modeling
Systems theory
Plots (graphics)
Pharmacokinetics